Alime Abdenanova
 Raushan Abdullin (ru)
 Magomedshamil Abduragimov
 Kanti Abdurakhmanov
 Nikolai Abramashvili
 Yuri Abramovich
 Sergey Avdeev
 Aleksandr Averkiev (ru)
 Vyacheslav Averyanov (ru)
 Ivan Averyanov (ru)
 Viktor Adamishin
 Arthur Adams
 Gennady Azarychev (ru)
 Aleksandra Akimova
 Vladimir Aleksandrov (ru)
 Aleksandr Alekseev (ru)
 Vladimir Alekseev (ru)
 Eduard Alekseev (ru)
 Vladimir Alimov (ru)
 Marat Alykov
 Stanislav Amelin (ru)
 Sergey Amosoc (ru)
 Gennady Anashkin (ru)
 Aleksandr Andreev (ru)
 Anatoly Andronov (ru)
 Sergey Anikin (ru)
 Yuri Anokhin (ru)
 Andrey Anoshchenkov (ru)
 Oleg Antonovich (ru)
 Ivan Anureev (ru)
 Timur Apakidze
 Marem Arapkhanova
 Sergey Arefyev (ru)
 Aleksey Artemyev (ru)
 Oleg Artemyev
 Aleksandr Artyukhin (ru)
 Valery Asapov
 Asker Askerov (ru)
 Aleksandr Astapov (ru)
 Vasily Afonin
 Marat Akhmetshin (ru)
 Igor Akhpashev (ru)
 Sergey Ashikhmin (ru)
 Mukhridin Ashurov (ru)

References 
 

Heroes A